David De Buck (born March 14, 1979, in Ghent, Belgium) is a gallerist and art dealer, owner of De Buck Gallery in New York City.

Biography
David De Buck is the grandson of Georges De Buck, founder of Spector International Photo Group (ticker: SPEC). After his studies, he worked in banking in Switzerland. In 2008, David De Buck moved to New York City and founded the De Buck Gallery, a contemporary and modern art gallery of international artists in Chelsea, Manhattan.

Personal life 
David De Buck is married to Danielle Stapen. They have three daughters: Chloe (b. 2010), Sienna (b. 2012), and Violet (b. 2018).

References

External links 
 De Buck Gallery

Belgian art dealers
Living people
1979 births
Businesspeople from Ghent
Swiss bankers